The Pineda Palace is a neoclassical building of Valencia. It was built in 1728.

Names’ origin 
The actual name is “Palau Pineda” or “Palau del Intendente Pineda”. It is because the palace was the residence of the “Intendente General de los Reinos de Valencia y Murcia”, and also “Justicia Mayor” of the city, Mr. Francisco Salvador de Pineda, the owner.

History 
The palace was built from 1728 to 1733. Mr. Francisco Salvador de Pineda was the first owner of the house, and he  was married with Francisca de Paula Negrete. He was attendant to collect taxes and so, he embezzled finances to built this palace. For this, he was dismissed of his work and obligated to go of his city, Valencia . In 1902, “Padres Maristas” settled down in the palace. In 1918 it was bought by the “Congregación de Hermanas del Sagrado Corazón de Jesús y de los Santos Ángeles”. During these years, the Pineda Palace was a convent and a residence that old women lived, and women who moved for studies and works in Valencia, too. The palace could receive 60 persons..
During the Spanish Civil War, the building was undamaged, but the flood of 1957 harmed the building seriously. In 1980 the Generalitat Valenciana purchased the palace and in 1992 it was restored. The palace was restored by Vicente González Móstoles and Alejandro Pons Romaní from 1990 to 1992.

Structure and style 
The neoclassical façade consists of two floors of balconies, built with reddish-toned brick. It is characterized by its symmetry, flanked by two small towers, and ind whose center is a door lintelled. On which stands the coat of arms of the Pineda. The shield is currently very damaged, although you can still distinguish the date of 1732, the supposed year of foundation of the building. It also highlights the legend written in the Filacteria of the shield, with the charge and the name of the holder. The plant of the building is approximately rectangular, whose measures are 23 x 34 meters. It consists of a hallway, mezzanine, two floors and attic. It also has a back garden, built later, which is currently the terrace of the cafeteria. The building has undergone several renovations during its history, such as changes in the walls for the adequacy of its use as a school, and as the turret attached to the rear facade. 
In the garden area outside the palace there is a sculpture by the painter Joan de Joanes.

Actual use 
In the present, the Pineda Palace has classrooms and meeting rooms. They are usually used by the Generalitat Valenciana, the entities whose headquarters is Pineda Palace or another entities with formative or institutional character. In the present, Pineda Palace is the headquarter of the Universidad Internacional Menéndez Pelayo and the  Institut Valencià d'Administració Pública.

References 

Neoclassical palaces
Buildings and structures in Valencia
Buildings and structures completed in 1733